Embryonic may refer to:
Of or relating to an embryo
Embryonic (album), a 2009 studio album by the Flaming Lips
Embryonics, a 2005 album by Alchemist